Tamarindo Airport  is a private airport that serves Tamarindo, a coastal resort in Guanacaste province, Costa Rica. It receives daily scheduled flights from San José and Liberia, and private charter services are available. During the rainy season, the airport is frequently closed due to the weather.

Tamarindo airport is the fifth-busiest in the country by passenger traffic, the third-busiest domestic-only airport after Puerto Jiménez and Quepos, and the busiest privately managed airport in Costa Rica.

Airlines and destinations

Passenger statistics

These data show number of passengers movements into the airport, according to the Directorate General of Civil Aviation of Costa Rica's statistical yearbooks.

See also
 Transport in Costa Rica
 List of airports in Costa Rica

References

External links
OurAirports - Tamarindo Airport

Tamarindo Beach Airport

Airports in Costa Rica
Buildings and structures in Guanacaste Province